K.R.H. Sonderborg (1923–2008) was a German painter, graphic artist, university professor and from 1980 for several years prorector of the State Academy of Fine Arts Stuttgart.

He was born in Sønderborg/Als, Denmark.  Starting in 1953, he became a member of the group Zen 49, and studied at the Atelier 17 in St. W. Hayter in Paris. In the years spent time working in London, New York City, Tokyo, Chicago,Osaka Cornwall, Ascona, Rome and Paris.

In 1951 the artist Kurt Rudolf Hoffmann called himself K.R.H. Sonderborg, after the town he was born in.
Sonderborg went to school in Hamburg and completed a merchant's apprenticeship in 1939. He became a private student of the painter Ewald Becker-Carus in Hamburg in 1946. From 1947 to 1949 he studied painting, graphic art and textile design at the State Art School in Hamburg under Willem Grimm and Maria May. In 1953 he joined the artists group Zen 49. He went to Paris the same year where he received training in engraving from Stanley William Hayter in the Atelier 17. Paris is also the place where he first encounters Tachism. In the following the artist goes on longer journeys and works for some time in London, Cornwall, New York, Ascona, Rome and Paris again. In New York K.R.H. Sonderborg comes into contact with Action Painting.

His own style is becoming abstract, painting in swift broads strokes, that reveal the painting process, with spontaneous color application. Black and white contrasts are an important feature, later he adds colors such as cadmium red.
K.R.H. Sonderborg takes part in the 1958 Biennale in Venice. He is awarded the Prize for Graphic Art at the Biennale in Tokyo in 1960 as well as the Great International Prize for Drawing at the 1963 Biennale in São Paulo. The artist shows works at the documenta in Kassel in both 1959 and 1964. From 1965 to 1990 he holds a post as professor for painting at the State Academy of Fine Arts Stuttgart. In 1969/70 he is guest lecturer at the Minneapolis College of Art and Design, as well as at the Art Institute of Chicago in 1986.
Along with artists such as Karl Otto Götz, Bernhard Schulze, K.R.H. Sonderborg belongs to the most important and most impressive representatives of German Informal Art.

K.R.H. Sonderborg died in Hamburg on 18 February 2008, aged 84.

External links 
 Interview with Deutsche Bank Art from 2003
 art aspects 
 ZKM 

Danish artists
Danish musicians
1923 births
2008 deaths
20th-century Danish painters
Atelier 17 alumni
20th-century Danish musicians
People from Sønderborg Municipality
Danish emigrants to Germany